Matabele ant refers to one of the following ant species or groups:

 Certain Afrotropical Dorylus species, also known as Driver ants
 Megaponera analis, a ponerine ant species

See also
Plectroctena spp., resemble M. analis but are not army ants